National Council of Science Museums (NCSM) is an autonomous organisation under Indian Ministry of Culture. It is the largest chain of science centers or museums under a single administrative umbrella in the world. There are 24 own science centers or museums and one R & D laboratory and training centre of NCSM, located in different states in India. Functioning under the Ministry of Culture (and drawing its funding primarily from it), the NCSM has been built to co-ordinate all informal science communication activities in the museum space in the country. Its raison d'etre is specified on the website as described in the section 'Genesis':

The first science museum, Birla Industrial and Technological Museum (BITM), Kolkata under CSIR43, was opened on 2 May 1959. In July 1965, the second science museum of the country, the Visvesvaraya Industrial & Technological Museum (VITM) was opened in Bangalore. After Kolkata and Bangalore, the work for the third centre in Mumbai was taken up in 1974. As the popularisation of science and technology through the science museums grew in scope and size, the Union Planning Commission constituted a task force in the early 1970s to assess the activities of the science museums. The task force recommended to set up science museums in different parts of the country at national, state and district levels and also recommended formation of a central coordinating agency. In 1978, it was decided by the Government of India to delink from CSIR the two science museums already operating at Kolkata and Bangalore and also the one being set up at Mumbai and put them under a newly formed society registered on 4 April 1978, as National Council of Science Museums (NCSM).

Own units
 Birla Industrial & Technological Museum, Kolkata, inaugurated on 2 May 1959
 Bardhaman Science Centre, Babur Bagh, inaugurated on 9 January 1994
 Digha Science Centre & National Science Camp, New Digha, inaugurated on 31 August 1997
 Dhenkanal Science Centre, Orissa, inaugurated on 5 June 1995
 District Science Centre, Purulia, inaugurated on 15 December 1982
 Kapilas Science Park, Dhenkanal, inaugurated on 5 June 1995
 North Bengal Science Centre, Matigara, inaugurated on 17 August 1997
 Regional Science Centre, Bhubaneswar, inaugurated on 18 September 1989
 Srikrishna Science Centre, Patna, inaugurated on 14 April 1978
 North Bengal Science Centre, Siliguri, inaugurated on 17 August 1997

 Central Research & Training Laboratory, Kolkata, R & D laboratory and training centre of NCSM. Operational since 1 January 1988 and dedicated to the nation on 13 March 1993

 Regional Science Centre, Guwahati, inaugurated on 15 March 1994

 National Science Centre, Delhi, inaugurated on 9 January 1992

 Regional Science City, Lucknow, operational since 1989
 Kurukshetra Panorama & Science Centre, Haryana, operational since 2000

 Nehru Science Centre, Mumbai, inaugurated on 11 November 1985

 District Science Centre, Dharampur, operational since 1984
 Goa Science Centre, Panjim, operational since 2002
 Raman Science Centre & Planetarium, Nagpur, operational since 1992 & 1996 respectively
 Regional Science Centre, Bhopal, operational since 1995

 Science City, Kolkata, fully operational since 1 July 1997
 Visvesvaraya Industrial and Technological Museum, Bangalore, operational since 1965

 District Science Centre, Gulbarga, operational since 1984
 District Science Centre, Tirunelveli, operational since 1987
 Regional Science Centre, Tirupati, operational since 1993
Regional Science Centre and Planetarium, Kozhikode, operational since 1997

Science centres developed for different state governments

See also
 Swami Vivekananda Planetarium, Mangalore

References

Technology museums
Science museums in India
1978 establishments in India
Scientific organisations based in India
Executive branch of the government of India
Government agencies established in 1978